Kevin Carter (13 September 1960 – 23 July 1994) was a South African photojournalist and member of the Bang-Bang Club. He was the recipient in 1994 of a Pulitzer Prize for his photograph depicting the 1993 famine in Sudan. He died by suicide at the age of 33. His story is depicted in the book The Bang-Bang Club, written by Greg Marinovich and João Silva and published in 2000.

Early life 
Kevin Carter was born in Johannesburg, South Africa, and grew up in a middle-class, whites-only neighbourhood. As a child, he occasionally saw police raids to arrest black people who were illegally living in the area. He said later that he questioned how his parents, a Catholic, "liberal" family, could be what he described as 'lackadaisical' about fighting against apartheid.

After high school, Carter dropped out of his studies to become a pharmacist and was drafted into the army. To escape from the infantry, he enlisted in the Air Force in which he served four years. In 1980, he witnessed a black mess-hall waiter being insulted. Carter defended the man, resulting in him being badly beaten by the other servicemen. He then went absent without leave, attempting to start a new life as a radio disc-jockey named "David". This, however, proved more difficult than he had anticipated. Soon after, he decided to serve out the rest of his required military service. After witnessing the Church Street bombing in Pretoria in 1983, he decided to become a news photographer and journalist.

Early work 
Carter had started to work as a weekend sports photographer in 1983. In 1984, he moved on to work for the Johannesburg Star, exposing the brutality of apartheid.

Carter was the first to photograph a public "necklacing" execution by black Africans in South Africa in the mid-1980s. Carter later spoke of the images: "I was appalled at what they were doing. But then people started talking about those pictures... then I felt that maybe my actions hadn't been at all bad. Being a witness to something this horrible wasn't necessarily such a bad thing to do."

In Sudan 
In March 1993, Robert Hadley of the UN Operation Lifeline Sudan offered João Silva the opportunity to travel to Sudan and report about the famine in South Sudan embedding with the rebels in that area's civil war. Silva told Carter, who felt it was an opportunity to expand his freelance career and use work as a way to address personal problems. Operation Lifeline Sudan had been having funding difficulties, and the UN believed that publicising the area's famine and needs would help aid organisations sustain funding. Silva and Carter were apolitical and desiring only to photograph.

After flying to Nairobi, the two found out that new fighting in Sudan would force them to wait in that city indefinitely. During this time, Carter made a day trip with the UN to Juba in the south Sudan to photograph a barge with food aid for the region. Soon afterwards, the UN received permission from a rebel group to fly food aid to Ayod. Hadley invited Silva and Carter to fly there with him. Once in Ayod, Silva and Carter separated to shoot photos of famine victims, discussing between themselves the shocking situations they were witnessing. Silva found rebel soldiers who could take him to someone in authority. Carter joined him. One of the soldiers, who did not speak English, was interested in Carter's wristwatch. Carter gave him the cheap watch as a gift. The soldiers served as their bodyguards.

Pulitzer Prize photograph in Sudan

Carter shot an image of what appeared to be a little girl, fallen to the ground from hunger, while a vulture lurked on the ground nearby. He told Silva he was shocked by the situation he had just photographed, and had chased the vulture away. A few minutes later, Carter and Silva boarded a small UN plane and left Ayod for Kongor.

Sold to The New York Times, the photograph first appeared on 26 March 1993, and syndicated worldwide. Hundreds of people contacted the newspaper to ask the fate of the girl. The paper said that according to Carter, "she recovered enough to resume her trek after the vulture was chased away" but that it was unknown whether she reached the UN food center. In April 1994, the photograph won the Pulitzer Prize for Feature Photography.

In 2011, the child's father revealed the child was actually a boy, Kong Nyong, and had been taken care of by the UN food aid station. Nyong had died four years prior, c. 2007, of "fevers", according to his family.

Other work 
In March 1994, Carter took a photograph of the three Afrikaner Weerstandsbeweging members being shot during their abortive invasion of Bophuthatswana just before the South African election. Carter ran out of film halfway through the incident. Eamonn McCabe of The Guardian said: "It was a picture that made nearly every front page in the world, the one real photograph of the whole campaign."

Death 

The final line is a reference to his recently deceased colleague Ken Oosterbroek.

In popular culture
The 1996 song "Kevin Carter" by rock band Manic Street Preachers, from their fourth album Everything Must Go, was inspired by Carter's life and suicide. The lyrics were written by Richey Edwards shortly before his own disappearance.

A main character in the book House of Leaves, Will Navidson, is a photojournalist who is tormented by guilt over winning a Pulitzer Prize for photo of a starving Sudanese girl but not helping her. In Footnote 336 it is mentioned that this is "clearly based on Kevin Carter's [...] photograph".

The 2001 album Poets and Madmen, by American heavy metal band Savatage, is inspired by the life and death of Kevin Carter.

In the 2010 film The Bang Bang Club, Carter was played by Taylor Kitsch.

References

Bibliography

Further reading 
 
 The Death of Kevin Carter: Casualty of the Bang Bang Club, HBO documentary. 17 August 2006

External links 

 Pulitzer Prize-winning photo of the girl in Sudan

1960 births
1994 deaths
Roman Catholic anti-apartheid activists
White South African anti-apartheid activists
South African people of British descent
The New York Times visual journalists
People from Johannesburg
South African photojournalists
Pulitzer Prize for Feature Photography winners
War photographers
South African Roman Catholics
South African photographers
Suicides by carbon monoxide poisoning
Suicides in South Africa
Bang-Bang Club
1994 suicides
Expatriate photographers in Sudan